Jordan Knight is the eponymous debut album by New Kids on the Block member Jordan Knight, released in 1999. Knight co-produced eight of the eleven tracks on the album with help from Jimmy Jam and Terry Lewis and a then unknown Robin Thicke. The album sold over 500,000 copies in the US alone and reached #29 on the Billboard 200.

Release 
The album was released in 1999 at the height of MTV pop culture. The first single, "Give It to You" received heavy radio airplay and rotation on MTV, as well as BET and VH1. The album was certified Gold months after its release.

In Asia, Knight and boy-band 98 Degrees headlined a tour in support of their albums.

Track listing 

Notes
 Credits adapted from liner notes and AllMusic.
 "A Different Party" contains a sample of "Green-Eyed Lady", as performed by Sugarloaf 
 "Don't Run" contains a sample of "Shook Ones (Part II)", as performed by Mobb Deep
 "Close My Eyes" contains a sample of "Dust in the Wind", as performed by Kansas

Personnel 
Credits adapted from the liner notes

 Jimmy Jam and Terry Lewis – keyboards, synthesizers, drum programming
 Robin Thicke - keyboards, synthesizers, drum programming
 Pro-Jay – keyboards, synthesizers, drum programming
 Claudio Cueni – keyboards, synthesizers, drum programming
 Alex Richbourg –  drum programming
 Stokley Williams – percussion
 Armand Sabalecco – bass
 Scott Kennedy – bass
 Big Jim Wright – piano
 Mike Scott – guitar
 Bobby B. Keyes – guitar
 Brion James – guitar
 Tyrone Chase – guitar
 Steve Hodge – engineer, mixing
 Bill Malina – engineer
 Miguel Pessoa – engineer
 Lior Goldenberg – engineer
 Claudio Cueni – engineer
 Will Pyon – engineer
 Mike Tucker – engineer
 Bray Merritt – engineer
 Evan Py – engineer
 Xavier Smith – mixing
 Claudio Cueni – mixing
 Joe Smith – mixing
 Jordan Knight – executive producer
 Miguel Melendez – executive producer
 FACET NY/LA – art direction

References 

1999 debut albums
Jordan Knight albums
Interscope Records albums
Albums produced by Robin Thicke
Albums produced by Jimmy Jam and Terry Lewis